Gregorio López is the name of:

 Gregorio López (writer) (1895–1966), Mexican novelist, poet, and journalist
 Gregorio López (handballer) (1951–1987), Spanish handball player
 Gregorio López (jurist) (1496–1560), president of the Council of the Indies

See also
 Gregorio López-Bravo y Castro (1923–1985), Spanish politician, Minister of Foreign Affairs between 1969 and 1973